Tuczępy  is a village in Busko County, Świętokrzyskie Voivodeship, in south-central Poland. It is the seat of the gmina (administrative district) called Gmina Tuczępy.

References

Villages in Busko County
Kielce Governorate
Kielce Voivodeship (1919–1939)